Phi Delta Gamma was a professional fraternity in the field of Forensics (public speaking).

History
Phi Delta Gamma was founded on June 7, 1924, at the College of William & Mary, combining chapters from the University of Iowa, Georgetown University School of Law, the University of Minnesota, the University of Illinois, Ohio University, George Washington University, and the University of Southern California. Founders were William O. Moore and George O. Hurley, State University of Iowa; Kenneth E. Oberholtzer, University of Illinois; Dean William A. Hamilton, College of William and Mary; Russell D. Tubaugh, Ohio University; Paul A. Lomax, University of Southern California; William Waldo Girdner, George Washington University; and Carl E. Anderson, University of Minnesota.

It was a founding member of the Professional Interfraternity Conference in 1928. It merged into Tau Kappa Alpha in 1935.

Publications
The magazine was The Literary Scroll

Chapters
These are the chapters of Phi Delta Gamma (professional).  Chapters in bold were active at the time of the merger, chapters in italics were inactive.  Per Baird's, all appear to have been active in 1935.
 1924 – IA Alpha – Iowa State University
 1924 – IL Alpha – University of Illinois
 1924 – VA Alpha – College of William & Mary
 1924 – OH Alpha – Ohio University
 1924 – CA Alpha – University of Southern California
 1924 – DC Alpha – George Washington University
 1924 – MN Alpha – University of Minnesota 
 1925 – AL Alpha – Auburn University
 1925 – TX Alpha – University of Texas
 1927 – IL Beta – Northwestern University
 1927 – OH Beta – Ohio State University
 1928 – IN Alpha – Indiana University

References

Former members of Professional Fraternity Association